Líneas Aéreas de Nicaragua, operating as LANICA, was an airline from Nicaragua. Headquartered in the capital Managua, it operated scheduled passenger flights within South and Central America, as well as to the United States.

History

 

Domestic services began in 1946 with Boeing 247 equipment. The company bought the assets of a local airline called Flota Aérea Nicaragüense (FANSA) in 1950, acquiring the control of the lucrative routes to the mining towns of Bonanza and Siuna in the north.

At , the fleet comprised seven DC-3s and one Navion that operated local routes; that year, the airline carried 21,852 passengers.

In early 1966, the carrier ordered a BAC One-Eleven 400. Starting , LANICA's own BAC One-Eleven was operated on a joint-ownership basis with TAN Airlines. The last BAC 1-11 was disposed of in October 1972.

Starting in May 1972, LANICA operated four examples of the larger four-engined Convair 880 jet airliner on their scheduled passenger services to Miami. The last was disposed of in 1977.

Pan Am's participation in the airline had decreased to 10% by 1975; private investors held 85% of the company until , when Howard Hughes took control of 25% of it, through Hughes Tool Company, in exchange for the lease of two Convair 880s. By , LANICA's fleet consisted of two Convair 880s, three C-46s and four DC-6s that served a route network including domestic services, as well as international passenger and cargo services to Mexico City, Miami and San Salvador. Two more Convair 880s were acquired in 1977.

The government of Somoza was overthrown following the rise to power of the Sandinistas in 1979. The shares held by the Somoza family —the major stockholders at the time— were seized by the Junta of National Reconstruction, but the airline's debts were not absorbed by the new government. At  that year, the airline had a fleet of two Boeing 727-100s, three C-46s and one DC-6, and employed a 450-strong staff. LANICA was succeeded by Aeronica as Nicaragua's flag carrier.

Destinations

LANICA offered scheduled international passenger flights to the following destinations:

Argentina
Buenos Aires
Chile
Santiago de Chile
Costa Rica
San José
Honduras
San Pedro Sula
Ecuador
Guayaquil 
Guatemala
Ciudad Guatemala
México
Mexico D.F.
Panamá
Panama City
Perú
Lima 
United States
Miami
Uruguay
Montevideo

Fleet
Over the years of its existence, LANICA operated the following aircraft types:

Accidents and incidents

See also

Transport in Nicaragua

Bibliography
 Eastwood, Tony, and Roach, John. Jet Airliner Production List. 2004. The Aviation Hobby Shop. ISBN none.

References

Defunct airlines of Nicaragua
Airlines established in 1946
Airlines disestablished in 1981
Companies based in Managua